Old Book is the name given to a purported ghost or spirit that haunts a cemetery and tree on the grounds of the Peoria State Hospital in Bartonville, Illinois. While rumors of ghosts and ghost stories are highly speculative, the Old Book tale has been documented many times. Among those documenting the tale is the first director of the state insane asylum, George Zeller.

The living Old Book
The name Old Book is the name given to a popular patient at the hospital. The well-liked Old Book worked as a gravedigger during his time at Peoria State Hospital. It is said that following burial services for deceased patients he would lean against an old elm tree and weep for the dead. Various sources report that Old Book's official name was recorded as Manual Bookbinder aka A. Bookbinder (1878 - 1910), grave marker 713 on the cemetery grounds. It is said that Old Book was mute, so no one could ask him his name. No one knows what his given name was, but he is allegedly called Bookbinder because of his previous occupation at the printing house where he worked before he was brought to the hospital. Despite his disabilities, he was one of the staff's most favored patients.

The Crying Tree
The superstitious tale surrounding Old Book is somewhat unusual among ghost stories in that it was reportedly witnessed by hundreds of people. The story goes that when Old Book died his funeral was attended by hundreds of patients and staff members who became witnesses to the ghostly phenomenon that was about to transpire. As workers were attempting to lower what should have been a heavy casket they discovered that it instead felt empty. Suddenly, a crying sound echoed from the Graveyard Elm and everyone in attendance turned and looked, including Dr. Zeller, who later detailed Bookbinder and the surrounding events in his diary. They all claimed to have seen Old Book standing by the tree. They so believed it to be true that Zeller had the casket opened to ensure that Old Book still lay inside. As the lid was opened the crying ceased and Old Book's corpse was found undisturbed in the coffin. Days passed and the tree began to die. Several of the grounds crewmen tried to remove the Graveyard Elm or the "crying tree", as it was also known.  None were successful, citing the weeping emanating from the tree. One man even tried to cut it down with an axe, but when striking the side, terrible wailing would sound as if Old Book himself was being chopped. 

In later years the elm was struck during a lightning storm and was finally removed from the potters field.

See also
List of ghosts

Notes

External links
 Bartonville Insane Asylum : on Prairieghosts.com

 

American ghosts
Peoria County, Illinois